Thanesar city or old Kurukshetra city is a historic town and an important Hindu pilgrimage centre in Kurukshetra district of the state of Haryana in northern India. It is located in Kurukshetra district, approximately 160 km northwest of Delhi. Thanesar city was the old name of Kurukshetra.

Kurukshetra (Sthanishwar) was the capital and seat of power of the Pushyabhuti dynasty, whose rulers conquered most of Aryavarta following the fall of the Gupta Empire. The Pushyabhuti emperor Prabhakarvardhana was a ruler of Thanesar in the early seventh century CE. He was succeeded by his sons, Rajyavardhana and Harsha. Harsha, also known as Harshavardhana, consolidated a vast empire over much of North India by defeating independent kings that fragmented from the Later Guptas.

History

The name Thanesar is derived from its name in Sanskrit, Sthanishvara which means Place/Abode of God. (Sthana-Place/region, Ishvara-Lord).

The present town of old Kurukshetra city (Thanesar city) is located on an ancient mound. The mound (1km long and 750m wide) is known as "Harsh ka Tila" (Mound of Harsha), west of Sheikh Chilli's Tomb complex in old Kurukshetra city. It has ruins of structures built during the reign of Harsha, 7th century CE. Amongst the archaeological finds from the mound include Painted Grey Ware shards in the pre-Kushana levels and  Red Polished Ware from post Gupta period.

In the post-Gupta period, the ancient city of Sthanishvara was the capital of the Vardhana dynasty, which ruled over a major part of North India during the late-6th and early-7th centuries. Prabhakarvardhana, fourth king of Vardhana dynasty and successor Adityavardhana, had his capital at Thanesar. After his death in 606 CE, his eldest son, Rajyavardhana, ascended the throne. Not long after, Rajyavardhana was murdered by a rival, which led to Harsha ascending to the throne at age 16. In the following years, he conquered much of North India, extended till Kamarupa, and eventually made Kannauj (in present Uttar Pradesh state) his capital, and ruled till 647 CE. His biography Harshacharita ("Deeds of Harsha") written by Sanskrit poet Banabhatta, describes his association with Thanesar, besides mentioning the defence wall, a moat and the palace with a two-storied Dhavalagriha (white mansion).

The town was sacked by Mahmud of Ghazni in 1011, due to Mahmuds call of jihad as the casus belli. This led to a drastic decline in prosperity in the region during the Sultanates.

During Mughal era, the Battle of Sthanishwar also known as Battle of the Ascetics took place in summer of 1567, between Mughal Emperor Akbar and Rajputs near Thanesar on the banks of the Sarsawati Ghaggar River.

Thanesar is listed in the Ain-i-Akbari as a pargana under the sarkar of Sirhind, producing a revenue of 7,850,803 dams for the imperial treasury and supplying a force of 1500 infantry and 50 cavalry. It had a brick fort at the time.

For much of the 18th century, Thanesar was under the suzerainty of the Maratha Empire, who collected revenue from the local rulers. Thanesar came under the British rule after the British victory in the Second Anglo-Maratha War in 1805. Under the British, it was part of the Cis-Sutlej states province from 1809 to 1862.

After the partition of India Thanesar's population greatly increased. On January 23 1973, a new district named Kurukshetra district was created, of which Thanesar was the main city. Thanesar now has a Municipal Council. Thanesar is a Legislative Assembly of Haryana constituency within the Kurukshetra (Lok Sabha constituency). People now tend, erroneously, to refer to Thanesar town as "Kurukshetra".

Majority of architectural remains including Karavan serai, cells, and various arched and vaulted structures date from the Mughal period. Building remains of a large palatial structure from the pre-Islamic era were also found with two distinct phases of construction which exposed brick covered drains and rooms situated around a central courtyard.

Sack of Thanesar by Mahmud of Gazni 
Thanesar was sacked and many of its temples were destroyed by Mahmud of Ghazni.

Firishta records that 

Mahmood having reached Punjab, required, according to the subsisting treaty with the Hindu Shahi king Anandpal, that his army should not be molested on its march through his country. An embassy was accordingly sent to inform the Raja of his intentions, and desiring him to send safety guards into his towns and villages, which he would take care to be protected from the followers of his camp. Anandpal the Shahi king, agreeing to this proposal, prepared an entertainment for the reception of the King, at the same time issuing orders for all his subjects to supply the camp with every necessity of life.

The Raja's brother, with 2,000 horses was also sent to meet the army and to deliver the following message:

"My brother is the subject and tributary of the King of Gazni, but he begs permission to acquaint his Majesty, that Thanesar is the principal place of worship of the inhabitants of the country: that if it is required by the religion of Mahmood to subvert the religion of others, he has already acquitted himself of that duty, in the destruction of the temple of Nagrakote. But if he should be pleased to alter his resolution regarding Thanesar, Anandpal Tuar promises that the amount of the revenues of that country shall be annually paid to Mahmood, that a sum shall also be paid to reimburse him for the expense of his expedition, besides which, on his own part, he will present him with fifty elephants, and jewels to a considerable amount."

Mahmood replied, "The religion of the faithful inculcates the following tenet: 'That in proportion as the tenets of the Prophet are diffused, and his followers exert themselves in the subversion of idolatry, so shall be their reward in heaven;' that, therefore, it behooved him, with the assistance of God, to root out the "worship of idols" from the face of all India. "How then should he spare Thanesar?"

This answer was communicated to Raja Anandpal Tuar of Delhi, who, resolving to oppose Sultan Mahmood, sent messengers throughout Hindoostan to acquaint the other rajas that Mahmood, without provocation, was marching with a vast army to destroy Thanesar, now under his immediate protection. He observed, that if a barrier was not expeditiously raised against this roaring torrent, the country of Hindoostan would be soon overwhelmed, and that it behooved them to unite their forces at Thanesar, to avert the impending calamity.

Mahmood, having reached Thanesar before the Hindus, had time to take measures for its defence; the city was plundered, the idols broken, and the idol Jugsoma was sent to Ghazni to be trodden underfoot. According to Hajy Mahommed Kandahary, a ruby was found in one of the temples weighing 450 miskals. It was allowed by everyone who saw it to be a wonder that had never been heard of. About the attack on Thanesar, Utbi wrote "The blood of the infidels flowed so copiously that the stream was discoloured, notwithstanding its purity, and people were unable to drink it."

Mahmood, after the capture of Thanesar, was desirous of proceeding to Delhi. But his nobles told him that it would be impossible to keep possession of it, till he had rendered Multan a province of his own government and secured himself from all apprehension of Anundpal, the Hindushahi Raja of Lahore. The king resolved, therefore, for the present, to proceed no further, till he had accomplished these objects. Anundpal Shahi, however, conducted himself with so much policy and hospitality towards Mahmood, that he returned peaceably to Ghazni. On this occasion, the Mahmood's army brought to Ghazni 200,000 captives, and much wealth, so that the capital appeared like an Indian city, no soldier of the camp being without wealth, or without many slaves.

Mughal era 

Sheikh Chilli's Tomb is located in Thanesar. This is tomb of Sufi Abd-ur-Rahim Abdul-Karim Abd-ur-Razak, popularly known by the name of Sheikh Chilli. He was Sufi master of Mughal Prince Dara Shikoh. The architectural plan shows considerable Persian influence. This tomb and attached Madarsa are associated with the Sufi Saint Abd-ur-Rahim.

Mughal Emperor Akbar, accompanied by his court historian Abul Fazl, visited Kurukshetra during the solar eclipse in 1567. Abul Fazl's Akbarnama refers to the eclipse in Kurukshetra and the pilgrims bathing in the Brahma Sarovar. The French traveler François Bernier of the Mughal Emperor Shahjehan's era also mentions the sacred baths at the Indus, Ganges and the sacred tanks of Thaneshwar (Kurukshetra) on the occasion of the solar eclipse.

Sikh Guru's visits 
Sikh Gurdwara is equally significant for the Sikhs. It was visited by Guru Amar Das, Guru Hargobind, Guru Har Rai, Guru Har Krishan, Guru Tegh Bahadur and Guru Gobind Singh. Four Gurdwaras are there in their memory: Gurdwara Dasvin Patshahi, Gurdwara Tisari and Satvin Patshahi and Gurdwara Navin Patshahi.
When Guru Amar Das Ji went on the 'long journey to Hardwar to see his old friends and acquaintances; and, as he went, scattered the blessings of Nam. On his way he halted at Thaneshwar, where the people asked why he composed hymns in the unknown Punjabi dialect and why not in
Sanskrit-the only language in which great truths can be expressed. The Guru said, "Sanskrit, now that is no longer the people's tongue, is like well water-sufficient for the irrigation of a small tract of land; whereas Punjabi, being the living language of the people, even if it be nothing but a dialect, is as the rain, which falls in showers all over the country."

British era

For their participation in first war of independence, the Chaudharys and Lambardars of villages who participated in rebellion in Haryana were also deprived of their land and property, including 368 people of Hisar and Gurugram were hanged or transported for life, and fine was imposed on the people of Thanesar (Rs 2,35,000), Ambala (Rs. 25, 3541) and Rohtak (Rs. 63,000 mostly on Ranghars, Shaikhs and Muslim Kasai).

Post-independence
An archaeological museum run by Archaeological Survey of India, was set up in Sheikh Chilli's Tomb complex. It consists of archaeological finds, like seals and sealings, terracotta figurines, plaques, ornaments, and swords from sites in nearby regions of Kurukshetra and Bhagwanpura. These objects are notably from Kushana (1st-3rd century CE), Gupta period (4th-6th CE), and from post Gupta period on Vardhana dynasty period (6th-7th CE).

Geography

It has an average elevation of 232 metres (761 feet).

Transport
Kurukshetra Junction railway station is a junction station at the junction of Delhi–Kalka line and Kurukshetra–Jind branch line. It is located in Kurukshetra city limits, It serves Kurukshetra and Thanesar city.

Demographics
As of 2011 census of India, Thanesar had a population of 154,962. Males constitute 55% of the population and females 45% (83,65571,307). Thanesar has an average literacy rate of 85.73%, higher than the national average of 74.04: male literacy is 89.89%, and female literacy is 80.85%. In Thanesar, 12% of the population is under 6 years of age.

Education
The modern city of Thanesar is an important educational center; it is home to Kurukshetra University, the National Institute of Technology, Kurukshetra (Formerly Regional Engineering College), University Institute of Engineering and Technology (UIET), Kurukshetra University and world's first AYUSH University Shri Krishna AYUSH University. The University Institute of Engineering and Technology  (U.I.E.T.) is situated in lush green campus of Kurukshetra University with about 1000 students on its roll. It has grown into a big institute with excellent placement record right from its inception. The Kurukshetra Institute of Technology & Management (KITM) is located 10 km from Kurukshetra University on Pehowa road, near Bhor Saidan village.

Administration
Thanesar now has a Municipal Council from 1994. In 1994 the municipal elections were conducted by the state government after a long time.

Tourism 

Kalpana Chawla Memorial Planetarium and Kurukshetra Panorama and Science Centre are located here.

Historical 
Dharohar Museum located within the Kurukshetra University campus, showcase the unique archaeological, cultural and architectural heritage of Haryana.

Thanesar Archaeological Site Museum, Vishvamitra Ka Tila are other tourist places.

Religious 

Thanesar derives its name from the words "Sthaneshwar" which means "Place of God." The Sthaneshwar Mahadev Temple, whose presiding deity is Lord Shiva, is believed to be place where the Pandavas with Krishna prayed to Lord Shiva and received his blessings for victory in the battle of Mahabharata. It is the central and the most important place in the 48 kos parikrama of Kurukshetra. 1.5 km from Thanesar on Kurukshetra-Pehowa road lies Narkatari, the water tank named Bhishma Kund is believed to be the spot when Bhishma lay of the bed of arrows during the Mahabharata war.
Kaleshwar Mahadev Temple and Dukha Bhanjan Mahadev Temples are the oldest temples of Thanesar. Other religious sites include the Brahma Sarovar, Jyotisar, the Sannihit Sarovar, Gurdwara 6th Patashahi and the Devi Bhadrakali temple, which is counted among the 51 Shakti Peethas. The bathing-fair held here on the occurrence of a solar eclipse is said to be attended by half a million pilgrims. Shri Krishna Museum 

Genealogy registers of pilgrims Hindu genealogy registers are maintained at Thanesa.

See also
Ror community
Tatka Village

References

Bibliography
 

History of Haryana
Ancient Indian cities
Cities and towns in Kurukshetra district
Former capital cities in India
Hindu pilgrimage sites in India